A Place to Call Home or Yu nu qin qing is a 1970 Hong Kong Shaw Brothers drama film directed by Wu Jiaxiang.

Cast
 Li Ching (actress)
 Margaret Hsing Hui - Irene Jang.
 Yi Ling Chen
 Barry Chan
 Yu Fang
 Kao Pao-shu
 Hsiao Chung Li
 Ying Ma
 Ouyang Sha-fei
 Lao Shen
 Feng Sun
 Jing Tang
 Chu Lin Tsang
 Chih-Ching Yang
 Chun Yen

Plot 
A girl from a well-to-do and loving family discovers she is adopted and goes in search of her biological mother. All is not well after she finds her real mother and moves in with her. Her stepfather tries to rape her but she escapes with the help of her adopted father and boyfriend. After the trials and tribulations, she realises that her home is where true parental love is.

References

External links
 
 A Place to Call Home at HKcinemamagic.com

1970 films
1970 drama films
1970s Mandarin-language films
Shaw Brothers Studio films
Hong Kong drama films
1970s Hong Kong films